Sa laurera (Peasant's labour in Sardinia) is an anthropological essay by Giulio Angioni, published by Edes in 1976 and by Il Mestrale in 2003.

Sa laurera (from Catalan "arar", "cultivar") is an accurate record of operations, seasonal fases, ways of working and vocabulary (with original illustrations) carried out by peasants in traditional Sardinia, before the great transformation in the second half of the twentieth century.

Sa laurera is to be considered along with other books by Giulio Angioni: Rapporti di produzione e cultura subalterna: contadini in Sardegna, Edes 1974; I pascoli erranti: antropologia del pastore in Sardegna, Liguori 1989; L'architettura popolare in Italia: Sardegna (with A. Sanna), Laterza 1988; Pane e formaggio e altre cose di Sardegna, Zonza 2002.

External links

Sa laurera on Sardegna Digital Library
Giulio Angioni in "The Great Encyclopedia of Sardinia"
Giulio Angioni in Encyclopedia Treccani

References 

Anthropological essays
Ethnography
Social anthropology
1976 essays